The Golden Horn is the second novel in The Hound and the Falcon trilogy by Judith Tarr, published in 1985.

Plot summary
The Golden Horn is a novel in which half-elven monk Alf becomes involved in the Fourth Crusade siege of Constantinople.

Reception
Dave Langford reviewed The Golden Horn for White Dwarf #86, and stated that "an elegant Georgette Heyer romance moved back in time".

Reviews
Review by Phyllis J. Day (1986) in Fantasy Review, January 1986
Review by Don D'Ammassa (1986) in Science Fiction Chronicle, #79 April 1986
Review by Mary Frances Zambreno (1986) in American Fantasy, Fall 1986
Review by Chris Barker (1987) in Vector 136

References

1985 American novels
1985 fantasy novels
American fantasy novels